Farino is a landlocked commune in the South Province of New Caledonia, an overseas territory of France in the Pacific Ocean. It and neighbouring Sarraméa are the only two communes on the island that do not border the sea.

References

Communes of New Caledonia